NTR or ntr may refer to:

Arts and entertainment 
 No Through Road (NTR), a 2009 British short film/web series
 NTR: Kathanayakudu, a 2019 Indian Telugu film about N. T. Rama Rao
 NTR: Mahanayakudu, a 2019 sequel to NTR: Kathanayakudu, also about N. T. Rama Rao
 Lakshmi's NTR, a 2019 Indian Telugu film about N. T. Rama Rao
 NTR: Netsuzou Trap, a manga series
 Netorare, Japanese term for cheating or being unfaithful, used in hentai media

Businesses and organizations 
 NTR plc, an Irish renewable energy company
 National Transcontinental Railway, a historic Canadian railway
 Nonprofit Technology Resources, a computer-refurbishing nonprofit organization
 NTR Trust, a not-for-profit Indian social welfare organization named after N. T. Rama Rao
 Omroep NTR, a Dutch public service broadcaster

Places 

 NTR district, administrative district in Andhra Pradesh, India named after N. T. Rama Rao

People 
 N. T. Rama Rao (1923–1996), known as NTR, Indian actor and politician
 N. T. Rama Rao Jr. (born 1983), or NTR Jr., Indian film actor and grandson of N. T. Rama Rao

Science 
 Neurotensin receptor 1, a protein encoded by the NTSR1, or NTR, gene
 Nuclear thermal rocket, a proposed spacecraft propulsion technology
 Non-catalytic tyrosine-phosphorylated receptors, receptor family present on immune cells

Other uses 
 Normal Trade Relations, a legal term in international trade
 nṯr, Egyptian language word for Ancient Egyptian deities
 Del Norte International Airport, Mexico, IATA code NTR
 Northallerton railway station, England, station code NTR
 , people considered unworthy of staying at the Hotel Ritz, Madrid